Ma Duanbin (born 28 March 1990) is a Chinese judoka.

He has represented his country at the World Judo Championships, and competed at the 2016 Summer Olympics in Rio de Janeiro, in the men's 66 kg.

References

External links
 
 

1990 births
Living people
Sportspeople from Liaoning
People from Benxi
Chinese male judoka
Olympic judoka of China
Judoka at the 2016 Summer Olympics
Judoka at the 2014 Asian Games
Universiade medalists in judo
Universiade bronze medalists for China
Asian Games competitors for China
Medalists at the 2011 Summer Universiade
20th-century Chinese people
21st-century Chinese people